This article details the Bradford Bulls rugby league football club's 2009 season, the 14th season of the Super League era.

Season Review

February 2009

March 2009

April 2009

May 2009

2009 Milestones

Round 4: Steve Menzies and Rikki Sheriffe scored their 1st tries for the Bulls.
Round 5: Semi Tadulala scored his 25th try and reached 100 points for the Bulls.
Round 6: Terry Newton scored his 25th try and reached 100 points for the Bulls.
Round 8: Michael Worrincy scored his 1st try for the Bulls.
Round 9: Paul Sykes reached 100 points for the Bulls.
Round 11: Craig Kopczak scored his 1st try for the Bulls.
Round 12: Paul Sykes scored his 1st hat-trick for the Bulls.
Round 14: Paul Sykes scored his 25th try for the Bulls.
Round 15: Julien Rinaldi scored his 1st try for the Bulls.
Round 17: Paul Deacon reached 2,500 points for the Bulls.
Round 19: Nick Scruton scored his 1st try for the Bulls.
Round 21: James Donaldson scored his 1st try for the Bulls.
Round 22: Elliott Whitehead scored his 1st try for the Bulls.
Round 22: Paul Deacon kicked his 1,100th goal for the Bulls.
Round 2: Dave Halley scored his 2nd hat-trick for the Bulls.
Round 25: Paul Deacon scored his 75th try for the Bulls.
Round 26: Chris Nero scored his 1st hat-trick for the Bulls.
Round 27: Paul Deacon reached 2,600 points for the Bulls.

Table

2009 Fixtures and results

2009 Engage Super League

Challenge Cup

2009 squad statistics

 Appearances and Points include (Super League, Challenge Cup and Play-offs) as of 2016.

References

External links
Bradford Bulls Website
Bradford Bulls in T&A
Bradford Bulls on Sky Sports
Bradford on Super League Site
Red,Black And Amber
BBC Sport-Rugby League

Bradford Bulls seasons
Bradford Bulls